Gene Morgan (March 12, 1893 – August 13, 1940) was an American actor. He appeared in 111 films between 1926 and 1941.

He was born in Racine, Wisconsin, United States, and died in Santa Monica, California.

Selected filmography

 Rogue of the Rio Grande (1930) - Mayor Seth Landport
 Anybody's Blonde (1931)
 Blonde Venus (1932)
 Hook and Ladder (1932 short)
 Song of the Eagle (1933)
 Panic on the Air (1936)
 Alibi for Murder (1936)
 End of the Trail (1936)
 Come Closer, Folks (1936)
 The Music Goes 'Round (1936)
 Counterfeit (1936)
 Counterfeit Lady (1936)
 Devil's Squadron (1936)
 Shakedown (1936)
 Make Way for Tomorrow (1937)
 Murder in Greenwich Village (1937)
 Woman in Distress (1937)
 All American Sweetheart (1937)
 Federal Man-Hunt (1938)
 The Main Event (1938)
 Mr. Smith Goes to Washington (1939, uncredited)
 Saps at Sea (1940)
 Meet John Doe (1941, uncredited)

References

External links

1893 births
1940 deaths
American male film actors
American male silent film actors
20th-century American male actors